SES-6 is a commercial geostationary communication satellite owned and operated by SES S.A.

Launch 
Constructed by EADS Astrium, it was launched on 3 June 2013 at 09:18:31 UTC from Baikonour by Proton-M / Briz-M launch vehicle and carries 43 C-band and 48 Ku-band transponders. With 43 C-band and 48 Ku-band 36 MHz equivalent transponders (38 C-band and 36 Ku-band physical transponders), the  satellite has a design life of 15 years. It is built on the Eurostar-3000 satellite bus.

Market 
The SES-6 satellite replaces the aging NSS-806 (launched on 28 February 1998 as Intelsat 806). It is nearly twice as large as NSS-806, with two C-band beams and has a total of five steerable Ku-band beams, including four beams for the Americas and one beam covering the Atlantic Ocean region. The C-band beams cover the East Atlantic (Europe, North Africa) and West Atlantic (United States, Mexico, South America). The Ku-band beams cover East Atlantic (Europe, Iceland, Greenland), West Atlantic (Eastern United States, Eastern Canada) and Brazil.

SES-6 offers 50% more C-band capacity for the cable community, and retain the unique capability to distribute content between the Americas and Europe on the same high powered beam. In addition, SES-6 offers a substantial upgrade to Ku-band capacity in the region with dedicated high power beams over Brazil, South cone, the Andean region, North America, Mexico, Central America and the Caribbean, while also offering an innovative payload to support mobile maritime and aeronautical services on the highly demanded routes from North America, the Gulf of Mexico, across the North Atlantic and to Europe.

Following the launch, SES announced a long-term capacity agreement to provide a new direct-to-home (DTH) platform in Brazil with Brazilian telecommunication group Oi, which would become the largest user of the new satellite.

See also 

 SES S.A. (satellite operator)

References

External links 
 SES - Official trade/industry site

Communications satellites in geostationary orbit
Spacecraft launched in 2013
SES satellites
SES-06
Satellites of Luxembourg